Thomas Mayne (1832–1915) was an Irish Parliamentary Party politician. He was elected as Member of Parliament (MP) for Tipperary at a by-election in 1883, and held the seat until the constituency was divided at the 1885 general election. He was then elected for the new Mid division of Tipperary, and held that seat until he resigned in 1890 by becoming Steward of the Manor of Northstead.

References

External links 
 

1832 births
1915 deaths
Members of the Parliament of the United Kingdom for County Tipperary constituencies (1801–1922)
UK MPs 1880–1885
UK MPs 1885–1886
UK MPs 1886–1892
Irish Parliamentary Party MPs